Speech interface guideline is a guideline with the aim for guiding decisions and criteria regarding designing interfaces operated by human voice. Speech interface system has many advantages such as consistent service and saving cost. However, for users, listening is a difficult task. It can become impossible when too many options are provided at once. This may mean that a user cannot intuitively reach a decision. To avoid this problem, limit options and a few clear choices the developer should consider such difficulties are usually provided. The guideline suggests the solution which is able to satisfy the users (customers). The goal of the guideline is to make an automated transaction at least as attractive and efficient as interacting with an attendant.

Examples of common design guideline 
The following guideline is given by the Lucent Technologies (now Alcatel-Lucent USA) CONVERSANT System Version 6.0 Application Design Guidelines
 Know Your Callers
 Use Simple and Natural Dialogue
 Minimize Demands on the Caller’s Memory
 Be Consistent
 Provide Feedback
 Provide Easy Exits
 Offer Shortcuts
 Allow Time for Caller Responses
 When Caller Errors Occur

See also
Human-computer interaction
Human interface guidelines
Speech processing
Speech recognition
Speech technology

References

External links
 Speech Interface Guidelines Alexander I. Rudnicky, School of Computer Science, Carnegie Mellon University
 School of Computer Science, Carnegie Mellon University 
 Voice User Interface Design VUI

Speech processing